Wallace Henry "Pat" Lindsey, III (March 17, 1936 – January 11, 2009) was a Democratic member of the Alabama Senate, representing the 22nd District since 1982.

Lindsey first won election to the Alabama Senate in 1966. He served eight years, being reelected in 1970. He then retired from politics for more than a decade. He returned to the political arena in 1990, defeating incumbent Rick Manley.

Lindsey's family has been prominent in the area of Butler, Alabama in Choctaw County for generations. After earning a degree in geology at the University of Alabama, Lindsey attended law school there and became a practicing attorney. Lindsey was married twice with both marriages ending in divorce. He was the father of two children.

External links
 Alabama State Legislature - Senator W.H. 'Pat' Lindsey official government website
Project Vote Smart - Senator W.H. 'Pat' Lindsey (AL) profile
Follow the Money - Pat Lindsey
2006 2002 1998 campaign contributions
Pat Lindsey official website

2009 deaths
1936 births
Alabama state senators
University of Alabama alumni
Politicians from Meridian, Mississippi
20th-century American politicians